Globant is an IT and Software Development company operating in Argentina, Colombia, Uruguay, the United Kingdom, Brazil, the United States, Canada, Peru, India, Mexico, Chile, Costa Rica, Ecuador, Spain, France, Germany, Romania and Belarus.  It was formed in 2003 by Martín Migoya, Guibert Englebienne, Martín Umaran and Néstor Nocetti.  It was founded in Buenos Aires, but currently is headquartered in Luxembourg and principally serves clients in the United States and United Kingdom.

History 
 2003: Globant started operations with own funded capital.
 2005: Globant opened its second Development GOV Center in Buenos Aires. The company was also named Endeavor Entrepreneur 2005 was recognized as the Best Services Exporter by Export.Ar  The Sloan School of Management of the MIT wrote a case about Globant called: "Leading the IT Revolution in Latin America".
 2006: Globant opened its development center in the city of Tandil, Argentina.
 2007: Globant was recognized as the Top Emerging Global Services Provider, by Global Services Magazine.
Globant opened offices in the city of La Plata, Argentina; and expanded its operations also in the US (Palo Alto). Globant founded Fonalix with BGH, a company that provides Voice over Internet Protocol for small and medium business in Latin America. 
 2008: The research company IDC pointed Globant as one of the growing companies in Latin America in its study "Latin American Predictions 2008". Globant Acquires Accendra, an Argentine   Software Company with 100 employees adding operations in Chile and Colombia. In December, Globant closed its third financing round of US$13MM with Riverwood Capital and FTV Capital. It also acquired Openware, an Argentine company specialized in Security & Infrastructure Management.Globant's team of Globers reached the 1000 professionals. The New York Times included Globant in an article about Argentinian software startups.
 2009: Globant received two teams from the Global Entrepreneurship lab from the MIT, to study the M&A strategy and the Globant University Project.
 2010: Globant was awarded with the AlwaysON 250 award for creating technology innovations for the Global Silicon Valley, in the Cloud and Infrastructure Category. It was also named Cool Vendor by Gartner, in the Cool Vendors in Business Process Services 2010 report by Gartner, Inc. During this year, Globant also reorganized itself and launched 8 studios, each one specializing in a different vertical, practice or industry. They are: Gaming, Big Data, Consumer Experience, Enterprise Consumerization, Creative & Social, Cloud Computing & Infrastructure, Mobile and Quality Engineering.
 2011: Globant acquired San Francisco-based Nextive, company specialized in the development of mobile applications and Globant's story with Google was showcased by Bloomberg.
 2012: Globant acquired Brazil-based TerraForum, company specialized in Innovation and Knowledge Management Consulting, Digital Marketing & Social Media and Software Development. 
 2012: Globant opened its development center in the city of Tucuman, Argentina.
 2013: WPP acquires minority stake in Globant to further strengthen its digital capabilities in the United States, United Kingdom, Latin America and beyond. Globant also acquired 86.25% of Huddle Group, a software company with operations in United States, Argentina and Chile.
 2014: FastCompany featured Globant as one of the world's top 10 most innovative companies in South America The company got listed on New York Stock Exchange.
 2014: Globant announced that they will make a Google Play-like dedicated hardware store for Project Ara
 2015: Globant acquired Clarice Technologies in May 2015 and expanded its presence in Asia.
2017: Globant acquired PointSource, a design and development tech agency specialized in providing digital transformation services across retail, supply chain and insurance industries. Globant acquired another company, Ratio, a leading digital services company specialized on video streaming services.
 2018: Globant acquires Small Footprint.
 2019: Globant acquires Avanxo, a leading cloud transformation company with presence in the United States, Brazil, Mexico, Colombia, Peru and Argentina.
 2019: In August of this year, Certified Collectibles Group, a collectibles company in Sarasota, Florida, filed a lawsuit in federal court against Globant. The lawsuit is seeking tens of millions of dollars in damages caused by Globant's alleged misconduct in regards to the creation of a new operating system for the collectibles company.  
2019: Globant acquires Belatrix Software, a leading agile product development company, to reinforce its presence in Latin America.
 2020: In January Globant acquires BiLive (Argentina). Later that same year, Globant acquired grupoAssa (Argentina), Xappia, Giant Monkey Robot "GMR" and BlueCap (Spain) companies.
 2021: In March, Globant acquired CloudShift (United Kingdom) in May it acquired Habitant, a European consulting firm. Later, in July it acquired the Spanish firm Walmeric, in October opened its development center in the city of San Jose, Costa Rica.

Within India, Globant also has a Bengaluru, Pune, India office in addition to its operations throughout South America, North America and Europe.

Revenue and headcount

References

Software companies of Argentina
International information technology consulting firms
Outsourcing companies
Information technology companies of Argentina
Companies listed on the New York Stock Exchange